Oswald Ducrot (born 27 November 1930) is a French linguist.  He was a professor and former research fellow at CNRS. He is currently a professor (directeur d'études) at the Ecole des Hautes Etudes en Sciences Sociales (EHESS) in Paris.

He is the author of a number of works, particularly on enunciation. He developed a theory of argumentation in language with Jean-Claude Anscombre.

Bibliography 
 with Tzvetan Todorov, Dictionnaire encyclopédique des sciences du langage, Seuil, 1972; 1979
 La preuve et le dire, Maison Mame, 1973
 Le structuralisme en linguistique, Seuil, Points, 1973 (d'abord publié dans un Collectif sur le structuralisme en 1968).
 Dire et ne pas dire. Principes de sémantique linguistique, Hermann, 3e éd. augm., 1998
 Le Dire et le Dit, Minuit, 1980
 Les Echelles argumentatives, Minuit, 1980
 et al. Les Mots du discours, Minuit, 1980
 with Jean-Claude Anscombre, L'argumentation dans la langue, Mardaga, 1983
 Logique, structure, énonciation. Lectures sur le langage, Minuit, 1989
 with Jean-Marie Schaeffer, Nouveau Dictionnaire encyclopédique des sciences du langage, Seuil, 1999
 with Marion Carel, La semántica argumentativa. Una introducción a la teoría de los bloques semánticos. Translated and edited by María Marta García Negroni and Alfredo Lescano. Buenos Aires, Colihue Universidad, 2005.

References

Linguists from France
Living people
1930 births